Lionel Cherrier (born 17 November 1929 in Nakéty, near Canala) is a New Caledonian politician.  He served in the Senate of France from 1974 until 1983, and was an Independent Republican.

References

1929 births
Living people
New Caledonia politicians
Independent Republicans politicians
French Senators of the Fifth Republic
Senators of New Caledonia